The Fredonia United States Post Office, located at 428 Madison St. in Fredonia, Kansas, was built in 1939.  It was listed on the National Register of Historic Places in 1989 as US Post Office--Fredonia.

It includes a ten-part terra cotta sculpture titled "Delivery of Mail to the Farm", by artist Lenore Thomas.  This was installed on the lobby wall above the postmaster's door in 1939.

References

Government buildings on the National Register of Historic Places in Kansas
Neoclassical architecture in Kansas
Government buildings completed in 1939
Wilson County, Kansas
Post office buildings on the National Register of Historic Places in Kansas